Curren may refer to the following people:
Given name
Curren Caples (born 1996), American skateboarder 
Curren Price (born 1950), American politician

Surname
Kevin Curren (born 1958), South African-American tennis player
L. Murray Curren (1873–1945), Canadian politician
Red Curren (1925–2010), Canadian basketball player 
Reg Curren (1914–1996), Australian politician 
Tom Curren (born 1964), American surfer 
Tom Curren (footballer) (born 1992), Australian rules footballer

See also
Curran (surname)

English-language surnames